A2000  may refer to:
 A2000 road, a road in Great Britain connecting Crayford and Slade Green
 Amiga 2000, a computer released in 1986